Marcio Ravelomanantsoa (born 15 October 1996) is a Malagasy football striker who currently plays for JET Kintana.

References

1996 births
Living people
People from Toliara
Malagasy footballers
Madagascar international footballers
Fomboni FC players
AS JET Mada players
JET Kintana players
Association football forwards
Malagasy expatriate footballers
Expatriate footballers in the Comoros
Madagascar A' international footballers
2022 African Nations Championship players